The monarchy of Saint Vincent and the Grenadines is the constitutional system of government in which a hereditary monarch is the sovereign and head of state of Saint Vincent and the Grenadines, forming the core of the country's Westminster-style parliamentary democracy. The Crown is thus is the foundation of the executive, legislative, and judicial branches of the Vincentian government. While Royal Assent and the royal sign-manual are required to enact laws, letters patent, and orders in council, the authority for these acts stems from the Vincentian populace, and, within the conventional stipulations of constitutional monarchy, the sovereign's direct participation in any of these areas of governance is limited, with most related powers entrusted for exercise by the elected and appointed parliamentarians, the ministers of the Crown generally drawn from amongst them, and the judges and Justices of the Peace.

The Vincentian monarchy has its roots in the French and British crowns, from which it has evolved over numerous centuries to become a distinctly Vincentian institution represented by unique symbols. The Vincentian monarchsince 8 September 2022, King Charles IIIis today shared equally with fourteen other countries within the Commonwealth of Nations, all being independent and the monarchy of each legally distinct. For Saint Vincent and the Grenadines, the monarch is officially titled King of Saint Vincent and the Grenadines, and he and other members of the royal family undertake various public and private functions across the country. However, the King is the only member of the royal family with any constitutional role. While several powers are the sovereign's alone, because he lives predominantly in the United Kingdom, most of the royal constitutional and ceremonial duties in Saint Vincent and the Grenadines are carried out by the King's representative, the governor-general.

International and domestic aspects

Saint Vincent and the Grenadines shares the same monarch in personal union with each of 14 other monarchies in the 56-member Commonwealth of Nations, a grouping known informally as the Commonwealth realms. Upon its independence from the United Kingdom, Saint Vincent and the Grenadines entered into this arrangement that had earlier emerged following the passage of the Statute of Westminster in 1931, since when the pan-national Crown has had both a shared and separate character, and the sovereign's role as monarch of Saint Vincent and the Grenadines has been distinct to his or her position as monarch of the United Kingdom. The monarchy thus ceased to be an exclusively British institution, though it is still often misnomered as "British" in both legal and common language, for reasons historical, political, and of convenience; this conflicts with not only the Royal Household's recognition and promotion of a distinctly Vincentian Crown, but also the sovereign's distinct Vincentian title, Charles the Third, by the Grace of God, King of Saint Vincent and the Grenadines and of His other Realms and Territories, Head of the Commonwealth.

Effective with the Constitution of Saint Vincent and the Grenadines, no British or other realm government can advise the sovereign on any matters pertinent to Saint Vincent and the Grenadines, meaning that on all matters of the Vincentian state, the monarch is advised solely by Vincentian Ministers of the Crown. As the monarch lives predominantly outside of Saint Vincent and the Grenadines, one of the most important of these state duties carried out on the advice of the Vincentian prime minister is the appointment of the viceroy, who is known as the governor-general of Saint Vincent and the Grenadines, and performs most of the Sovereign's domestic duties in their absence.

The islands had been part of the West Indies Federation from 1958 until its dissolution in 1962, had won home rule in 1969 as part of the West Indies Associated States, and achieved full independence in 1979. 
 When the status of association of Saint Vincent with the United Kingdom was due to terminate in 1979, and it became necessary to establish a new constitution on its attaining fully responsible status within the Commonwealth, the House of Assembly had requested the making of the Order in Council which constituted Saint Vincent and the Grenadines as a sovereign democratic state. The Saint Vincent Constitution Order 1979 was made under the West Indies Act 1967 and came into operation on 27 October 1979. Under the new constitution the Oath of Allegiance to the sovereign was to continue.

Succession

Succession to the throne is by absolute primogeniture, and governed by the provisions of the Succession to the Crown Act 2013, as well as the Act of Settlement and the English Bill of Rights. Though, via adopting the Statute of Westminster, these constitutional laws as they apply to Saint Vincent and the Grenadines now lie within the full control of the Vincentian parliament, Saint Vincent and the Grenadines also agreed not to change its rules of succession without the unanimous consent of the other realms, unless explicitly leaving the shared monarchy relationship; a situation that applies symmetrically in all the other realms, including the United Kingdom, and has been likened to a treaty amongst these countries. Thus, Saint Vincent and the Grenadines' line of succession remains identical to that of the United Kingdom; however, the rules for succession are not fixed, but may be changed within Saint Vincent and the Grenadines by a constitutional amendment by the Vincentian parliament.

Upon a demise of the Crown (the death or abdication of a sovereign), the late sovereign's heir immediately and automatically succeeds, without any need for confirmation or further ceremonyhence arises the phrase "The King is dead. Long live the King!." Following an appropriate period of mourning, the monarch is also crowned in the United Kingdom in an ancient ritual, but one not necessary for a sovereign to reign. After an individual ascends the throne, he or she typically continues to reign until death, being unable to unilaterally abdicate per the tenets of constitutional monarchy.

Personification of the state

As the living embodiment of the Crown, the sovereign is regarded as the personification, or legal personality, of the Vincentian state, with the state therefore referred to as His Majesty in right of His Government in Saint Vincent and the Grenadines, The King (Saint Vincent and the Grenadines), or simply The King. As such, the monarch is the owner of all state propertyfor instance, prisons in Saint Vincent and the Grenadines are called His Majesty's Prisonsthough, this is all in their position as sovereign, and not as an individual; all such property is held by the Crown in perpetuity and cannot be sold by the sovereign without the proper advice and consent of their ministers.

Constitutional role
Saint Vincent and the Grenadines' constitution is made up of a variety of statutes and conventions that are either British or Vincentian in origin, and together give Saint Vincent and the Grenadines a parliamentary system of government wherein the role of the monarch is both legal and practical. The Crown is regarded as a corporation, with the sovereign, vested as she is with all powers of state, as the centre of a construct in which the power of the whole is shared by multiple institutions of government acting under the sovereign's authority. Though her authority stems from the people, all Vincentians live under the authority of the monarch. The vast powers that belong to the Crown are collectively known as the Royal prerogative, the exercise of which does not require parliamentary approval, though it is not unlimited; for example, the monarch does not have the prerogative to impose and collect new taxes without the authorization of an Act of Parliament. Also, per convention, the sovereign reigns according to Vincentian law; this is illustrated in the sovereign's Coronation Oath, wherein he or she promises to govern her peoples "according to their respective laws and customs."

The Crown also sits at the pinnacle of the Royal Saint Vincent Police Force. All new recruits into the force must swear allegiance to the monarch as the embodiment of the state and its authority, the oath including the words: "I, [name], do swear that I will well and truly serve Our Sovereign Lord the King as a member of the Police Force in Saint Vincent and the Grenadines without favour or affection, malice or ill will; and that I will cause His Majesty's Peace to be preserved..."

Executive
The government of Saint Vincent and the Grenadines is the monarch's government, and is defined by the constitution as the King (or Queen) acting on the advice of their Cabineta committee charged with advising the Crown on the exercise of the Royal Prerogative. One of the main duties of the Crown is to appoint a prime minister to thereafter head this group; the monarch is informed by their viceroy of the swearing-in and resignation of prime ministers and other members of the ministry, remains fully briefed through regular communications from their Vincentian ministers, and holds audience with them whenever possible.

In the construct of constitutional monarchy and responsible government, the ministerial advice tendered is typically binding, meaning the monarch reigns but does not rule; this has been the case in Saint Vincent and the Grenadines since the Treaty of Paris ended the reign of the territory's last absolute monarch, King Louis XV. It is important to note, however, that the Royal Prerogative belongs to the Crown and not to any of the ministers, and the royal and viceroyal figures may unilaterally use these powers in exceptional constitutional crisis situations. There are also a few duties which must be specifically performed by, or bills that require assent by, the monarch; these include applying the royal sign-manual and Great Seal to the appointment papers of governors general, the creation of Vincentian honours, and the approval of any change in their Vincentian title.

Parliament
The sovereign is one of the two components of parliament, and all laws are the monarch's laws, as illustrated in the enacting formula for Vincentian acts of parliament, which reads: "BE IT ENACTED by the King's Most Excellent Majesty by and with the advice and consent of the House of Assembly of Saint Vincent and the Grenadines and by the authority of the same as follows." The monarch and viceroy do not, however, participate in the legislative process, save for the granting of Royal Assent, which is necessary for a bill to be enacted as law.

Courts

The sovereign is responsible for rendering justice for all their subjects, and is thus traditionally deemed the fount of justice. However, they do not personally rule in judicial cases; instead the judicial functions of the Royal Prerogative are performed in trust and in the monarch's name by Officers of Her (or His) Majesty's Court. Extending from this is the notion in common law that the sovereign "can do no wrong"; the monarch cannot be prosecuted in their own courts for criminal offences. Civil lawsuits against the Crown in its public capacity (that is, lawsuits against the King or Queen-in-Council) are permitted; however, lawsuits against the monarch personally are not cognizable. The monarch, and by extension the governor general, also grants immunity from prosecution, exercises the Royal Prerogative of Mercy, and may pardon offences against the Crown, either before, during, or after a trial.

As the judges and courts are the sovereign's judges and courts, and as all law in Saint Vincent and the Grenadines derives from the Crown, the monarch stands to give legitimacy to courts of justice, and is the source of their judicial authority. An image of the sovereign and/or the Arms of His Majesty in Right of Saint Vincent and the Grenadines is always displayed in Vincentian federal courtrooms.

Royal visits

Members of the royal family undertake official royal tours. Usually important milestones, anniversaries, or celebrations of Vincentian culture will warrant the presence of the monarchsuch as when Queen Elizabeth II and her husband, Prince Philip, Duke of Edinburgh, toured the country to mark its anniversary of independencewhile other royals will be asked to participate in lesser occasions. Apart from Saint Vincent and the Grenadines, the monarch and other members of the royal family regularly perform public duties in the other fourteen nations of the Commonwealth in which the monarch is head of state.

Queen Elizabeth II visited in 1966, where she attended a morning service at St George's Cathedral, and visited the Colonial Hospital and the Victoria Park. In 1985, she and the Duke of Edinburgh attended the Independence Anniversary Parade. The Duke presented Duke of Edinburgh's Award Scheme Gold Awards during a ceremony at Government House.

The Prince of Wales and Duchess of Cornwall have visited St Vincent and the Grenadines on the latest leg of their Caribbean tour in March 2019.

Debate
There had been little debate on the monarchy of Saint Vincent and the Grenadines before Prime Minister Ralph Gonsalves initiated in 2002, the year of Queen Elizabeth's Golden Jubilee, a republican movement against what he deemed to be "the remnants of colonialism," eventuating in a constitutional referendum in 2009, just days before the Queen was in the Caribbean for a Commonwealth Heads of Government Meeting. Despite heavy campaigning by the Ministers of the Crown, the referendum was defeated with only 43.13% of voters supporting the idea, well short of the required two-thirds threshold.

List of Vincentian monarchs

See also

 Prime Ministers of Queen Elizabeth II
 List of Commonwealth visits made by Queen Elizabeth II
 Monarchies in the Americas
 List of monarchies

Notes

References

External links 
Queen's Official website on St. Vincent and the Grenadines

Monarchy in Saint Vincent and the Grenadines
Government of Saint Vincent and the Grenadines
Politics of Saint Vincent and the Grenadines
Saint Vincent and the Grenadines
Heads of state of Saint Vincent and the Grenadines
1979 establishments in Saint Vincent and the Grenadines
Monarchies of North America
Kingdoms